Dashtagan (also Romanized as Dashtagān) is a village in Kalashtar Rural District, in the Central District of Rudbar County, Gilan Province, Iran. At the 2006 census, its population was 109, in 35 families.

References 

Populated places in Rudbar County